Bob LaRose (March 6, 1946 – April 25, 2022) was a Canadian football player who played professionally for the Winnipeg Blue Bombers.

References

1946 births
2022 deaths
Winnipeg Blue Bombers players